James Duncan Schroder (27 August 1918 – 13 December 2013) was a Canadian Liberal Party politician who served as a member of the House of Commons of Canada. He practised and taught Veterinary medicine by career. He was born in Guelph, Ontario.

Schroder graduated from Ontario Veterinary College in 1942. He entered national politics at the Ontario riding of Guelph in the 1980 federal election, serving in the 32nd Canadian Parliament, but lost the seat in the 1984 election to William Winegard of the Progressive Conservative party. He died at his home on 13 December 2013.

electoral record

References

External links
 

1918 births
2013 deaths
Canadian veterinarians
Male veterinarians
Liberal Party of Canada MPs
Members of the House of Commons of Canada from Ontario
People from Guelph
University of Guelph alumni